Geri Coleman Tucker is an American journalist who has served as an editor and a reporter at USA Today, Gannett News Service, the Detroit Free Press and the Akron Beacon Journal.

Biography
Tucker was born in Cincinnati, Ohio. She obtained her degree from Kenyon College in Gambier, Ohio.

She also writes Asperger Ascent, a blog for young adults on the autism spectrum. While working at USA Today, Tucker served as deputy managing editor and at Gannett News Service she was the regional managing editor. She worked for both newspapers for 30 years.

She is married to Michael A. Tucker and has one child. She resides in Springfield, Virginia.

References

Living people
American women journalists
Kenyon College alumni
American bloggers
Detroit Free Press people
USA Today journalists
21st-century American non-fiction writers
American women bloggers
Year of birth missing (living people)
21st-century American women writers